The Château de Châteauneuf, also known as the Château de Châteauneuf-en-Auxois, is a 15th-century fortress in the commune of Châteauneuf, 43 km from Dijon, in the Côte-d'Or département of France. It is a vast stone building, 75 metres in length and 35 metres broad, situated on a rocky outcrop 475 metres above the surrounding plains. It dominates the valley of Canal de Bourgogne.

History 
The castle was built in 1132 by Jean de Chaudenay for his son Jehan, who took possession of it in 1175 and became Jean I de Châteauneuf. Facing the threat of the Hundred Years' War, the lords of Châteauneuf then built the powerful fortifications around the 12th century keep. After nine generations in the castle, the reign of the Châteauneufs ended in tragedy when in 1456 the last heiress, Catherine de Châteauneuf, was burnt alive for poisoning her second husband, Jacques d'Haussonville.

In 1457, Philippe le Bon, duke of Burgundy, offered the fortress to his advisor Philippe Pot, also of the Order of the Golden Fleece and a knight of Saint Michael. He then modified the castle to make it more comfortable as a residence, in keeping with the style of the court of the Duchy of Burgundy. A chapel and a residence dated to this time were built out in the court of the castle, in the flamboyant Gothic architectural style. At multiple places in the castle one can find the device of Philippe Pot, « Tant L Valt ».

Philippe died in 1493 without leaving an heir, so the castle went to his brother Guy Pot, then via various alliances to Marie Liesse de Luxembourg. With their entrance into the convent, the castle then passed to Charles de Vienne, count of Comarrin, and remained in the hands of this family for the next 150 years. In 1767, Louis Henri de Vienne sold the castle to a rich banker.

During the French Revolution, all royal symbols and armorial bearings were defaced or destroyed. The castle was then auctioned and passed through various hands until 1936, when the count George de Vogue donated it to the state and Châteauneuf and its neighbouring village were declared as protected historical monuments.

Architecture 

The Château de Châteauneuf is a vast stone building, 75 metres in length and 35 metres broad.

See also 
 List of castles in France

External links 

 Web-site of the Friends of the Châteauneuf-en-Auxois
 

Castles in Bourgogne-Franche-Comté
Historic house museums in Bourgogne-Franche-Comté
Museums in Côte-d'Or
Monuments historiques of Côte-d'Or